= Green Legacy Initiative =

Ethiopian agency for environmental restoration

Green Legacy Initiative is an Ethiopian agency that is focused on the reforestation and restoration of landscapes in Ethiopia. The agency was launched in 2019 by the Prime Minister Abiy Ahmed. They are focused on planning mass trees in both urban and rural area, improving the climate reaction in the community.
